Ngaanyatjarra (also Ngaanyatjara, Ngaanjatjarra) is an Australian Aboriginal language. It is one of the Wati languages of the large Pama–Nyungan family. It is one of the dialects of the Western Desert Language and is very similar to its close neighbour Ngaatjatjarra, with which it is highly mutually intelligible.

Most Ngaanyatjarra people live in one of the communities of Warburton, Warakurna, Tjukurla, Papulankutja (Blackstone), Mantamaru (Jameson) or Kaltukatjara (Docker River). Some have moved to Cosmo Newbery and Laverton in the Eastern Goldfields area of Western Australia.

Origin of the name
The name Ngaanyatjarra derives from the word  'this' which, combined with the comitative suffix  means 'having  (as the word for 'this')'. This distinguishes it from its near neighbour Ngaatjatjarra, which has  for 'this'.

Phonology
Orthography is in brackets.

Vowels

 Vowel sounds are rhotacized when preceding retroflex consonants.

Consonants

 Laminal stop sounds are different in the Ngaanyatjarra dialect, in that they are not palatal, but dental, yet they are still orthographically transcribed the same as the other dialects.
When occurring after nasal sounds, stop consonants become slightly voiced.

Notes

Citations

Sources

External links 
 ELAR archive of Western Desert Special Speech Styles Project

Wati languages